Diplostomida is an order of trematodes in the subclass Digenea. It is synonymous with Strigeida Poche, 1926.

Families
Order Diplostomida
Suborder Diplostomata
Superfamily Brachylaimoidea Joyeux & Foley, 1930
Brachylaimidae Joyeux & Foley, 1930
Leucochloridiidae Poche, 1907
Superfamily Diplostomoidea Poirier, 1886
Brauninidae Wolf, 1903
Cyathocotylidae Mühling, 1898
Diplostomidae Poirier, 1886
Proterodiplostomidae Dubois, 1936
Strigeidae Railliet, 1919
Superfamily Schistosomatoidea Stiles & Hassall, 1898
Aporocotylidae Odhner, 1912
Schistosomatidae Stiles & Hassall, 1898
Spirorchiidae Stunkard, 1921
Clinostomoidea Lühe, 1901 has been synonymised with Schistosomatoidea Stiles & Hassall, 1898.

 
Platyhelminthes orders